The Congress of Black Women of Canada (CBWC) / Congrès des femmes noires du Canada, which began in 1973, is a national non-profit organization that "is dedicated to improving the lives of all Black women and their families in their local and national communities." It arose to organize Canadian Black women and focus on their specific issues and concerns, separate from the general women's movement and Black nationalist organizations, which did not always represent the interests of Black women around issues of race, gender, and class oppression. The organizing and advocacy work of the CBWC has focused on "such issues as health, housing, racism, education, immigration, criminal law, police-community relations and child development."

History 
The Congress of Black Women of Canada (CBWC) was formed in 1973 in Toronto with Kathleen "Kay" Livingstone as Chair. It developed out of the Canadian Negro Women’s Association (CANEWA), which began in 1951, with Kay Livingstone as its first president.

The CBWC incorporated as a registered non-profit organization in 1980.

Jean Augustine, who founded the Toronto chapter of the CBWC in 1973, became president of the organization in 1987, and was awarded the first annual Kay Livingstone award that year.

References 

Women's organizations based in Canada
1973 establishments in Ontario
African-Canadian women's organizations
African-Canadian feminism

Organizations established in 1973